Matvei Vaisberg (born 28 December 1958) is a Ukrainian painter, graphic artist and book designer.

Biography
Matvei Vaisberg is the only son of Semion Vaisberg, a chess trainer, and Shelly Harzman, an art historian; a  grandson of the poet Matvey Harzman (Motl Harzman) on his mother’s side and Berta J. Vaisberg, a seven-time Ukraine Champion in chess, on his father’s. 
In 1985, he graduated from Ivan Fiodorov Ukrainian Printing Institute (nowadays Ukrainian Academy of Printing). In 1988, he started to take part in collective exhibitions. In 1990, his first personal exhibition took place in the Historical Museum of Podol (Kiev). 
More than fifty of both collective and his personal exhibitions have taken place by now, including those in the National Art Museum (Kyiv), Kyiv National Museum of Russian Art (Kyiv), Museum of Contemporary Art in Odessa (Odessa), Cherkasy Museum of Fine Arts (Cherkasy), Berlin Wall Museum (Berlin), Ukrainian Institute of America (New York), Europe House (London), the Sejm of the Republic of Poland (Warsaw), Georgian National museum Georgia.

Creative work

Vaisberg deeply appreciates the creative work of many artists, especially that of Georges Rouault, Chaïm Soutine and Francisco Goya. 
Together with Andrij Mokrousov, an art and literary critic, he developed the conception of art arrière-garde many years ago and represents it in his art. Along with being a stranger to the mimetic, he cannot be considered to be close to abstract art at the same time. Without reckoning himself as a religious artist or a religious human, he nevertheless remains a faithful adherent of biblical themes (Days of Creation, Book of Job, Scenes from TaNaK).
In 2014, the artist turned his attention to the event, taking place in Kyiv during 2013-2014, and painted “Wall” cycle.

Painting cycles

Matvei Vaisberg is the author of “Seven Days” (1998-1999), “Judaean Desert” (2001), “Anthropic Principle” (2004-2008), “Dancings” (2006-2009), “Scenes from TaNaK” (2006), “Holy Heaven Remains Silent” (2008), “Pur Vital” (2006), “Threetwotwo” (2009), “Wall” (based on the prints for the Old Testament by Hans Holbein the Younger, 2012), and others.
In 2014, it was one more time when the artist painted a cycle, named “Wall”. The cycle was done from 28.01.2014 to 08.03.2014. It was dedicated to the event on Maidan Nezalezhnosti (Independence Square) in Kyiv in 2013-2014. The author himself was a witness of the developments and an active participant in the historical event.
The cycle consists of 28 pictures, each measuring 45 cm by 60 cm, which are exhibited as a single block, looking like a wall. 
The cycle was shown in Kyiv, London, Berlin, New York, Los Angeles, Warsaw (the Sejm of the Republic of Poland, 05.03.2015) and other cities in Poland. The artist is going to present the cycle to the public in Italy, USA and Ukraine.

Book design

Vaisberg is an illustrator of the books by Sholem Aleichem, Eduard Bagritsky, Isaac Babel, Grigorijus Kanovičius, José Ortega y Gasset, Carl Jung, Søren Kierkegaard, Fyodor Dostoyevsky and Joseph Roth.

Works of art in museums and galleries

Painting and graphic works by Matvei Vaisberg are in museums and galleries in Kyiv, Vilnius, Chicago, Berlin and other cities as well as in private collections in different countries of the world.
In 2014, the Magnes Museum (Berkeley, California, USA) bought 12 pictures by Vaisberg for its collection of Jewish art and life. Four of them are portraits of the famous Yiddish-language Jewish poets, executed by Soviet NKVD in 1952 (Jewish Anti-Fascist Committee case, Night of the Murdered Poets), Itzik Feffer (1900-1952), Leib Kvitko (1890-1952), Peretz Markish (1895-1952), David Hofstein (1889-1952); four – of the famous writers and poets Sholem Aleichem, Osip Mandelstam, Boris Pasternak and David Bergelson.

References

External links
 Gallery on-line
 Interviewing the artist, 2010 (in Russian)
 Interviewing the artist for a project of Torf TV
 Matvei Vaisberg: There’s a very interesting game in Kyiv
 Artistic Bohemia in Barricade Fighting. Part 7. Matvei Vaisberg
 “While the Ashes Gleam” exhibition in the “Spiritual riches of Ukraine” museum, Kyiv
 “Wall” 28.01.2014 – 08.03.2014
 Virtual tour to Matvei Vaisberg’s studio
 Literary Minds. Soviet Jewish Writers portrayed by Matvey Vaisberg
 About Matvei Vaisberg on the Virtual Museum of Judaica website (Kyiv)

1958 births
Living people
Ukrainian Jews
Ukrainian male painters
Ukrainian painters
Jewish painters
Modern painters